Melvin Purvis: G-Man is a 1974 American TV movie about Melvin Purvis. It is a spin-off of Dillinger (directed by John Milius, co-author of the teleplay for this movie) and was followed in 1975 by The Kansas City Massacre, also directed by Dan Curtis and starring Dale Robertson as Purvis.

Plot
In this largely fictionalized film, agent Melvin Purvis is placed in charge of running down notorious killer Machine Gun Kelly and sets out to do just that. The film script is loosely based on Kelly's actual 1933 kidnapping of an Oklahoma petroleum executive, but the names and locations are changed. However, the film does accurately depict Kelly as a weak man who is dominated by his ambitious wife.

Cast
 Dale Robertson as Melvin Purvis
 Harris Yulin as Machine Gun Kelly
 Dick Sargent as Thatcher Covington
 Margaret Blye as Katherine Ryan-Kelly
 David Canary as Eugene T. Farber
 Matt Clark as Charles "Charlie" Parlmetter

Production
In January 1974 there were reports Ben Johnson would reprise his role as Melvin Purvis in an ABC Movie of the Week called Purvis, which would act as a pilot for a potential series. Eventually the role was taken by Dale Robertson and Dan Curtis was the show runner. It was American International Pictures' first proper venture into TV production.
 
Filming was done in Nicolaus, Michigan Bar and Sloughhouse in California.

In a 1976 interview, Milus called Dan Curtis "this asshole director." He also didn't like working for TV. "I don't like the way the networks screw around with you. The pay isn't the thing that turns me off; I'm not out to get the most money. You slave and toil over the thing and then they cut this out, cut that out, change this, for some damn reason. I won't tolerate that. I don't work hard on something to have it bowdlerized that way."

Reception
The Los Angeles Times thought the pilot was superior to Dillinger "because here character and motivation are made to count much more than mere violence."

It was the second highest rating program of the week. It led to another TV movie The Kansas City Massacre (1975) though no series.

Retitled for foreign markets
The film was released cinematically outside the USA, but since "Machine Gun" Kelly was better known than Melvin Purvis, promotion emphasized Kelly, and the film was renamed under titles mentioning Kelly. One title was "The Legend of Machine Gun Kelly".

References

External links

1974 television films
1974 films
1974 crime drama films
Biographical films about Depression-era gangsters
American crime drama films
ABC Movie of the Week
Films directed by Dan Curtis
Cultural depictions of Machine Gun Kelly
Films set in 1933
Films shot in California
American drama television films
1970s American films